Vigevano Cathedral (Cattedrale di Sant'Ambrogio) is a Roman Catholic cathedral dedicated to Saint Ambrose and located in the Piazza Ducale of Vigevano, Italy. It is the seat of the Bishop of Vigevano. The present building dates from the 16th century, with a west front of the 1670s.

History
The initial structure on the site was built before the year 1000 and is referred to in documents of as early as 963 and 967. 

The current structure was commissioned by Duke Francesco II Sforza in c. 1530 and is dedicated to Saint Ambrose. Construction on the cathedral, designed by Antonio da Lonate (c. 1456 c.–c. 1541), began in 1532 but was not completed until 1612. The edifice of the cathedral was completed in 1606 and it was consecrated on 24 April 1612.

The Spanish Bishop of Vigevano, Juan Caramuel y Lobkowitz, redesigned the west front of Vigevano Cathedral, work which began in 1673 and was completed c. 1680. The only architectural work known to be done by Caramuel, his design displays virtuosity, an eclectic sense, and an interesting geometrical relationship to the square which is cleverly adjusted to bring the ancient cathedral into a line perpendicular to and centered on the axis of the piazza.

Description
The interior is designed on the Latin cross plan, with the nave containing a central aisle and two side aisles, and houses works by Macrino d'Alba, Bernardino Ferrari and others, as well as a tempera polyptych of the school of Leonardo da Vinci.

Treasury
The cathedral is best known for the "treasury" donated to it by Francesco II Sforza in 1534 which encompasses more than 100 precious objects. These, along with other items, are on display in a museum inside the cathedral known as the Museo del Tesoro del Duomo Vigevano. Of note in the collection are several Flemish tapestries, seven of which were made by tapestry makers in Brussels in 1520 in the Late Gothic International Style and five of which were woven in Oudenarde at the beginning of the 17th century. Also on exhibit are an ornate crosier in ivory, a gold-plated silver reliquary of the Lombardy school of goldsmiths from c. 1530, numerous precious corals, missals, codices and manuscripts dating from the late 15th century, and many chalices, goblets, monstrances and reliquaries in different styles and from different eras. Also of interest is a 16th-century wall-hanging embroidered in gold which was used in Monza in 1805 for the coronation of Napoleon Bonaparte.

Organ
The church's first organ was built by Gian Giacomo Antegnati in 1554. Composer Antonio Cagnoni notably served as the cathedral's maestro di cappella from 1852-1879.

References

External links
 Cathedral of St. Ambrose - Church of the Dinosaur Skull at Atlas Obscura.

Churches in Vigevano
Roman Catholic cathedrals in Italy
Cathedrals in Lombardy
Baroque architecture in Lombardy
Cathedral
17th-century Roman Catholic church buildings in Italy
Roman Catholic churches completed in 1612
Roman Catholic churches completed in 1680
1680 establishments in Italy